Zhu Yuqing (born 22 April 1963) is a retired Chinese heptathlete.

She finished eighth at the 1987 World Championships and twelfth at the 1991 World Championships. On the regional level she won the 1986 Asian Games and the 1991 Asian Championships.

References

1963 births
Living people
Chinese heptathletes
Athletes (track and field) at the 1992 Summer Olympics
Olympic athletes of China
Asian Games medalists in athletics (track and field)
Athletes (track and field) at the 1986 Asian Games
Asian Games gold medalists for China
Medalists at the 1986 Asian Games